Hugh Taylor may refer to:
 Hugh Taylor (American football) (1923–1992), American NFL football player
 Hugh Taylor (priest) (died 1585), English Catholic martyr
 Hugh Taylor (rugby union) (1894–1956), Australian rugby union player
 Hugh Taylor (Australian politician) (1823–1897), New South Wales politician
 Hugh Taylor (MP) (1817–1900), British Member of Parliament for Tynemouth and North Shields
 Hugh P. Taylor, Jr., American geochemist on the faculty of Caltech
 Sir Hugh Stott Taylor (1890–1974), English chemist
 Sir Hugh Taylor (civil servant) (born 1950), former Permanent Secretary at the Department of Health
 Hugh Taylor (archivist) (1920–2005)

See also
 Hugh Taylor Birch State Park, a state park in Florida, USA